The fast food chain McDonald's is referred to by a variety of nicknames worldwide.

List

References 

McDonald's